Silvio Borjas (born April 19, 1990) is a Paraguayan professional footballer who plays as a centre-back for Cruz Azul.

References

1990 births
Living people
Paraguayan footballers
Association football central defenders
Cruz Azul footballers
Paraguayan expatriate footballers
Paraguayan expatriate sportspeople in Mexico
Expatriate footballers in Mexico